Tiruchanur (also known as Alamelu Mangapuram) is a suburb and neighbourhood of Tirupati and is located in Tirupati district of the Indian state of Andhra Pradesh. It is a part of Tirupati urban agglomeration. It is the mandal headquarters of Tirupati (rural) mandal. It is a religious destination for Hindu pilgrims due to the presence of Padmavathi Temple. It falls in the jurisdictional limit of Tirupati Urban Development Authority.

Etymology 

It was originally called AlarMelMangai Puram, based on evidence from thousands of inscriptions in and around Tirupathi, later corrupted to Alamelu Mangapuram.

History
Tiruchanoor formed a part of Tiruvenkatam under the rule of Pallavas and was a part of Rajendra Cholamandalam, under the Cholas..

Transport 

Tiruchanur is famous for Kalyanamandapams/Function halls. People believe that it’s very auspicious to get married at Tiruchanur. TTD owns some function halls in Tollappa Gardens. Plenty of home stays/service apartments are also available for economical stay. Several restaurants are also available for the pilgrims.

Education
The primary and secondary school education is imparted by government, aided and private schools, under the School Education Department of the state.

References 

Tirupati
Mandal headquarters in Tirupati district
Hindu pilgrimage sites in India